Andrew James Harrower Dougal (born September 1951) is a British businessman particularly associated with the financial management of construction and property-related companies.

Dougal worked with Hanson plc from 1986 in a range of general and financial management roles, rising to be group finance director, then chief executive from 1997 until 2002, during which time Hanson focused on building materials, becoming the world's biggest aggregates supplier and the second largest supplier of ready-mixed concrete. Dougal left Hanson with a large pay-off (variously reported at between £400,000 and £660,000, plus a pension top-up of £636,700) after quitting the group to "rebalance" his life.

Dougal is a member of the Institute of Chartered Accountants of Scotland and a member of its Council, and has advised on the responsibilities of non-executive directors.

Non-executive director roles
Dougal has been a non-executive director of Taylor Wimpey, Taylor Woodrow and Creston plc (2006–2015), chairing the audit committee in all three. He has also been a non-executive director of Premier Farnell (resigning in 2015) and BPB plc.

Dougal was appointed a non-executive director of Carillion plc in October 2011, chairing its audit committee, and was a member of the board in the run-up to Carillion going into liquidation on 15 January 2018. In January 2021, the Insolvency Service said it would seek to ban eight former Carillion directors, including Dougal, from holding senior boardroom positions.

He was a non-executive director of Victrex plc (appointed March 2015), but resigned in February 2018 after being included on an Investment Association listing relating to corporate governance issues.

References

1951 births
Living people
Carillion people